Cool Spring (sometimes known as Cool Springs) is a small unincorporated community in Horry County, South Carolina, United States. Cool Spring lies approximately twelve miles north of Conway and about four miles southeast of Aynor on South Carolina Highway 319. It is a historic community known for its small spring and was referred to by local residents many years ago as the cool springs.

External links

Unincorporated communities in South Carolina
Unincorporated communities in Horry County, South Carolina